Woodbourne is a census-designated place (CDP) in Bucks County, Pennsylvania, United States. The population was 3,851 at the 2010 census.

Geography
Woodbourne is located at  (40.202319, -74.888825).

According to the United States Census Bureau, the CDP has a total area of 1.2 square miles (3.2 km), all  land.

Demographics

As of the 2010 census, the population was 88.2% White, 2.4% Black or African American, 0.1% Native American, 5.9% Asian, 0.1% Native Hawaiian or Other Pacific Islander, and 1.0% were two or more races. 2.4% of the population were of Hispanic or Latino ancestry.

At the 2000 census there were 3,512 people, 1,008 households, and 955 families living in the CDP. The population density was 2,882.1 people per square mile (1,111.5/km). There were 1,008 housing units at an average density of 827.2/sq mi (319.0/km).  The racial makeup of the CDP was 93.65% White, 1.88% African American, 3.19% Asian, 0.03% Pacific Islander, 0.20% from other races, and 1.05% from two or more races. Hispanic or Latino of any race were 1.48%.

There were 1,008 households, 62.9% had children under the age of 18 living with them, 87.8% were married couples living together, 4.9% had a female householder with no husband present, and 5.2% were non-families. 3.5% of households were made up of individuals, and 0.9% were one person aged 65 or older. The average household size was 3.48 and the average family size was 3.58.

The age distribution was 35.7% under the age of 18, 6.3% from 18 to 24, 27.5% from 25 to 44, 27.6% from 45 to 64, and 2.9% 65 or older. The median age was 36 years. For every 100 females, there were 102.1 males. For every 100 females age 18 and over, there were 98.5 males.

The median household income was $107,913 and the median family income  was $109,739. Males had a median income of $72,188 versus $46,607 for females. The per capita income for the CDP was $33,821. None of the population or families were below the poverty line.

References

Census-designated places in Bucks County, Pennsylvania
Census-designated places in Pennsylvania